Joyous is the third album by Portland, Oregon-based R&B group Pleasure. It was released in 1977 and produced by jazz legend Wayne Henderson of The Crusaders.

Track listing
"Joyous" 	6:26 	
"Let Me Be The One" 	5:11 	
"Only You" 	3:20 	
"Can't Turn You Loose" 	4:14 	
"Sassafras Girl" 	6:46 	
"Tune In" 	6:37 	
"Dance to the Music" 	4:50 	
"Selim" 	3:48

Personnel
Marlon "The Magician" McClain – Guitar, Backing Vocals
Sherman Davis – Lead and Backing Vocals
Bruce Carter – Drums
Nathaniel Phillips – Bass, Backing Vocals
Dan Brewster – Trombone
Donald Hepburn, Michael Hepburn – Keyboards, Backing Vocals
Dennis Springer – Soprano Saxophone, Tenor Saxophone
Bruce Smith – Tambourine, Bell Tree, Cowbell, Congas, Cuica, Drums (Flexitone), Backing Vocals
Mayo Tiano – Trombone
Dennis Christianson, Steve Madaio – Trumpet
Robert Carr – Baritone Saxophone
Herman Riley –  Alto Saxophone, Tenor Saxophone, Flute
Armand Kaproff, Nathan Gershman – Cello
Paul Shure – Violin, Concertmaster
Alex Neiman, Allan Harshman, Pamela Goldsmith – Viola
Betty LaMagna, Bonnie Douglas, Dorothy Wade, Israel Baker, Janet Lakatos, Nathan Kaproff, Nathan Ross, Robert Sushel, Stanley Plummer – Violin

Charts

Singles

References

External links
 Pleasure-Joyous at Discogs

1977 albums
Fantasy Records albums
Pleasure (American band) albums
Albums recorded at Total Experience Recording Studios
Albums produced by Wayne Henderson (musician)